Kreigh Collins may refer to:
 Kreigh Collins (tennis)
 Kreigh Collins (cartoonist)